Enzo Rubén Oviedo (born 6 April 1994) is an Argentine professional footballer who plays as a central midfielder for Gimnasia y Esgrima.

Career
Oviedo, after passing through Lanús' academy, began his senior career with Primera D Metropolitana's Victoriano Arenas. One goal in thirty-six matches arrived across the 2015 and 2016 seasons. In June 2016, Oviedo agreed to join fellow fifth tier team Leandro N. Alem. He appeared twenty-nine times in his first season with the club, as they secured promotion to Primera C Metropolitana for 2017–18. After three goals in tier four, Oviedo moved up to Primera B Metropolitana with Comunicaciones. He made his bow in August 2018 versus Acassuso, while his first goal came months later against Deportivo Español in a win.

Gimnasia y Esgrima became Oviedo's fourth senior club in January 2020. He was sent off in his second appearance against Sportivo Las Parejas on 2 February.

Career statistics
.

References

External links

1994 births
Living people
Place of birth missing (living people)
Argentine footballers
Association football midfielders
Primera D Metropolitana players
Primera C Metropolitana players
Primera B Metropolitana players
Torneo Federal A players
Victoriano Arenas players
Club Leandro N. Alem players
Club Comunicaciones footballers
Gimnasia y Esgrima de Concepción del Uruguay footballers